Out of the Cellar is the debut studio album by American heavy metal band Ratt. Released in 1984, it was an immediate success, with wide airplay on radio and heavy rotation on MTV of its singles, especially the hit "Round and Round". The album is certified as triple platinum by the RIAA. The album brought Ratt to the top of the glam metal scene in Los Angeles. Ratt's later work would never surpass the success of Out of the Cellar.

According to interviews with Beau Hill that were shot for the film Hair I Go Again, Tom Allom was originally slated to produce the record before the novice Hill was brought in.

Songs 
Produced by Beau Hill, Out of the Cellar features Ratt's best-known hit, "Round and Round." It also contains other popular songs such as "Wanted Man," "Lack of Communication," and a re-recorded version of "Back for More." The latter song originally appeared on the EP Ratt. "In Your Direction" was a song that Pearcy wrote when the band was still called Mickey Ratt; "I'm Insane" and "Scene of the Crime" were songs Crosby had co-written and performed with his pre-Ratt band, Mac Meda, featuring future Riverdogs vocalist Rob Lamothe. In 2008, "Round and Round" and "I'm Insane" were featured in The Wrestler.

"Wanted Man" was co-written by bassist Joey Cristofanilli, who had briefly substituted for Juan Croucier. There are original lyrics on Juan Croucier's website for "She Wants Money" and "Lack Of Communication."

Cover art
The model on the album cover is Tawny Kitaen, better known for her appearances in Whitesnake music videos, and the same year's teen-aimed film Bachelor Party. The long-time girlfriend of Ratt guitarist Robbin Crosby at the time, Kitaen also appeared in the "Back for More" music video.

Track listing

Personnel
Ratt
Stephen Pearcy – lead vocals
Robbin Crosby – lead & rhythm guitar, backing vocals
Warren DeMartini – lead & rhythm guitar, backing vocals
Juan Croucier – bass guitar, backing vocals
Bobby Blotzer – drums, percussion

Production
Beau Hill – producer, engineer
Jim Faraci – engineer
Dave Clark, Clif Smith, Robin Laine, Ray Leonard – assistant engineers
Dennis King – mastering
Bob Defrin – art direction

Charts

Certifications

See also
 List of glam metal albums and songs

References

Ratt albums
1984 debut albums
Atlantic Records albums
Albums produced by Beau Hill
Albums recorded at Sound City Studios